Christian Dorsey (born 1971 in Atlantic City, New Jersey) is an American politician in Arlington County, Virginia. He previously worked at the Economic Policy Institute. His areas of expertise are community development, housing, race and the economy.

Career

Dorsey joined EPI in 2008. Dorsey's work there has been to build an awareness of economic policy matters on a grassroots level as an advocate for the EPI with a goal of educating and mobilizing both middle class and disenfranchised communities for equally shared prosperity.

Dorsey also served as the Executive Director of the Bonder and Amanda Johnson Community Development Corporation, and as Executive Director for The Reading Connection, a Northern Virginia-based non-profit organization that provides literacy programs for children.

Education

Dorsey holds a B.S., International Relations from Georgetown University School of Foreign Service.

Controversies

Dorsey declared bankruptcy on October 16, 2019 (Wash Post, 11-07-2019) just prior to being re-elected to a term on the Arlington County Board in November 2019.  Although under no legal obligation to do so, and running largely unopposed, Mr. Dorsey did not notify the public of his bankruptcy, which he later clarified, “In retrospect, I should have had a conversation with the community, no matter how difficult, when I filed for bankruptcy in mid-October...”

Further in November 2019 Mr. Dorsey was stripped of his chairmanship of the Washington Metro's Finance Committee for failing to disclose an $10,000 donation from Amalgamated Transit Union Local 689 for 4 months.  Mr. Dorsey pledged to return the funds, but in January 2020 falsely said  he'd already returned the funds.  In February he appears to have written another check, only for it to remain uncashed for 5 months.  When pressed he  claimed the union told him the check had been lost in the mail.  The funds remained unreturned until July 30, 2020  when Dorsey submitted a picture of a cashier's check to various news outlets.  In December 2020, a federal Bankruptcy Judge dismissed Dorsey's bankruptcy case, agreeing with the bankruptcy trustee that Dorsey had made an "overt misrepresentation" to the court; the dismissal came under a United States Code section reserved for cases of bankruptcy fraud.

References

External links
 .
 Arlington County Board chair Christian Dorsey filed bankruptcy petition in Oct.
 Metro board weighs penalizing member Christian Dorsey for late disclosure of $10,000 donation from transit union.
 Arlington County Board chair Christian Dorsey yet to repay $10,000 donation. again.
 Arlington County Board chair Christian Dorsey filed bankruptcy petition in Oct.

Economists from Virginia
African-American people in Virginia politics
1971 births
Walsh School of Foreign Service alumni
American columnists
American television personalities
American radio personalities
American economics writers
American male non-fiction writers
Writers from Atlantic City, New Jersey
Living people
County supervisors in Virginia
Virginia Democrats
People from Arlington County, Virginia
Economists from New Jersey
21st-century American economists
21st-century African-American people
20th-century African-American people